"Bridge" is a song by progressive metal band Queensrÿche appearing on their 1994 album Promised Land.

Chart performance

Personnel
Geoff Tate - vocals
Michael Wilton - lead guitar
Chris DeGarmo - rhythm guitar
Eddie Jackson - bass
Scott Rockenfield - drums

References

Queensrÿche songs
1994 singles
Songs written by Chris DeGarmo
1994 songs
EMI America Records singles
Songs about fathers